Rampur is a village in Garhani block of Bhojpur district, Bihar, India. As of 2011, its population was 3,170, in 416 households.

See also 

 Other places with name Rampur

References 

Villages in Bhojpur district, India